The Geropotamos ( or Ιερός Ποταμός) is a watercourse in southern Crete in Greece. It rises on the north slope of the Asterousia Mountains, near the village Sternes. It flows west through the Messara Plain and discharges into the Libyan Sea near Tympaki. This river was a source of water supply for the ancient Minoan settlement of Phaistos. The Ieropotamos was heavily drawn upon by the Minoans because of the intensity of farming, even in the Bronze Age at Phaistos. Scientists have determined that the groundwater basin may have been overdrafted some time in the Bronze Age, being a contributing factor to the mysterious depopulation of Phaistos.

References

Rivers of Greece
Rivers of Crete
European drainage basins of the Mediterranean Sea